Sir James Timmins Chance, 1st Baronet (22 March 1814 – 6 January 1902), was an English industrialist, philanthropist, director of the London and North Western Railway, and an expert in lighthouse optics. He served in public office, including as a Justice of the Peace for Staffordshire and Worcestershire in 1851, Deputy Lieutenant of Staffordshire in 1856 and for Worcestershire in 1859 (in which time he set up the first Volunteer Rifle Corps in the country), and High Sheriff of Staffordshire in 1868.

He was a nephew of Lucas Chance, the founder of the family firm, glassmakers, Chance Brothers, of which James was, like his father, also William, a partner and eventually head, until his retirement in 1889, when the company was formed into a public company and the name changed to Chance Brothers & Co. Ltd.

He was educated at London University, then Trinity College, Cambridge.

He gave West Smethwick Park to the public in 1895, and donated £50,000 to the endowment fund of Birmingham University in 1900. The park includes a memorial to him, in brick and terracotta, with a bronze bust by Hamo Thornycroft. Beneath the bust is a plaque reading:

He was awarded a Baronetcy in 1900, to which he was succeeded by his son, Sir William Chance, 2nd Baronet (1853–1935).

He sat for a portrait by John Callcott Horsley in 1851. Another, by Joseph Gibbs, may have been painted posthumously. It was presented to Smethwick Borough Council in December 1902, eleven months after the subject's death. It is now in Wednesbury Museum and Art Gallery.

Bibliography

References 

1814 births
1902 deaths
People from Smethwick
English industrialists
Baronets in the Baronetage of the United Kingdom
London and North Western Railway people
19th-century English businesspeople